This is a list of notable Indian male film actors.

A 

 A. K. Hangal
 Aadhi
 Aadi Pudipeddi
 Aamir Khan
 Aashish Chaudhary
 Abbas
 Abhay Deol
 Abhijeeth
 Abhishek Bachchan
 Abhishek Banerjee
 Abhishek Chatterjee
 Abhimanyu Dassani
 Abhimanyu Singh
 Abijeet Duddala
 Abir Chatterjee
 Achyuth Kumar
 Adhyayan Suman
 Adil Hussain
 Aditya Babu
 Aditya Pancholi
 Aditya Kumar
 Aditya Roy Kapur
 Aditya Seal
 Adoor Bhasi
 Aftab Shivdasani
 Ahuti Prasad
 Ajay
 Ajay Devgan
 Ajay Ghosh
 Ajay Rao
 Ajaz Khan
 Ajinkya Dev
 Ajit Khan
 Ajith Kumar
 Ajmal Ameer
 Aju Varghese
 Akkineni Akhil
 Akhilendra Mishra
 Akshay Anand
 Akshay Kumar
 Akshaye Khanna
 Akshay Oberoi
 Akul Balaji
 Ali Basha
 Ali Fazal
 Ali Zafar
 Allari Naresh
 Allu Arjun
 Allu Sirish
 Alok Nath
 Amar Talwar
 Ambareesh
 Amitabh Bachchan
 Amit Sadh
 Amit Sial
 Amjad Khan
 Ammy Virk
 Amol Palekar
 Amrish Puri
 Anand Tiwari
 Ananth Nag
 Angad Bedi
 Anil Kapoor
 Aniruddha Jatkar
 Anjan Srivastav
 Ankush Chaudhari
 Ankush Hazra
 Annu Kapoor
 Anoop Kumar
 Anoop Menon
 Anshuman Jha
 Anubhav Mohanty
 Anuj Gurwara
 Anupam Kher
 Anupam Sharma
 Anup Soni
 Anurag Kashyap
 Anwar Hussain
 Aparshakti Khurana
 Apurva Agnihotri
 Aravind Akash
 Arbaaz Khan
 Arif Zakaria
 Arjan Bajwa
 Arjun Kapoor
 Arjun Mathur
 Arjun Rampal
 Arjun Sarja
 Arshad Warsi
 Arun Sarnaik
 Arun Vijay
 Arunoday Singh
 Arvind Krishna
 Arvind Swamy
 Arya Babbar
 Arya Cethirakath
 Asif Ali
 Asif Basra
 Ashish Vidyarthi
 Ashok
 Ashok Kumar
 Asrani
 Ashok Saraf
 Ashok Selvan
 Ashutosh Rana
 Atharvaa
 Attakathi Dinesh
 Atul Agnihotri
 Atul Kulkarni
 Atul Parchure
 Auditya
 Avinash Tiwary
 Avinash
 Ayushmann Khurrana

B 

 B. C. Patil
 B. R. Panthulu
 Baburaj
 Babu Antony
 Balakrishna
 Balakrishna Nandamuri
 Balakrishna Valluri
 Balan K. Nair
 Balaraj
 Balraj Sahni
 Bank Janardhan
 Barun Sobti
 Benjamin Gilani
 Bhagwan Dada
 Bhanu Chander
 Bharat Bhushan
 Bharat Jadhav
 Bharath Gopi
 Bharath Srinivasan
 Bharathiraja
 Bank Janardhan
 Bijay Mohanty
 Bijon Bhattacharya
 Biju Menon
 Biju Phukan
 Biswajit Chatterjee
 Biswaroop Roy Chowdhury
 Bob Christo
 Bobby Deol
 Bobby Kottarakkara
 Bobby Simha
 Bonny Sengupta
 Boman Irani
 Brahmanandam
 Brijendra Kala
 Bullet Prakash

C 

 C. R. Simha
 Chandra Mohan (Hindi actor)
 Chandra Mohan (Telugu actor)
 Chandrachur Singh
 Chandrashekhar (actor)
 Charan Raj
 Charlie
 Charu Haasan
 Chetan Chandra
 Chetan Kumar
 Chhabi Biswas
 Chi. Guru Dutt
 Chinni Jayanth
 Chikkanna
 Chiranjeevi Konidala
 Chiranjeevi Sarja
 Chunky Pandey
 Crazy Mohan
 Cyrus Broacha
 Cyrus Sahukar

D 

 Dada Kondke
 Dalip Tahil
 Danny Denzongpa
 Dara Singh
 Darshan
 Darsheel Safary
 Dattatreya
 David
 Deepak Dobriyal
 Deepak Tijori
 Dev (Bengali actor)
 Dev (Tamil actor)
 Dev Anand
 Dev Gill
 Devan
 Devaraj
 Deven Verma
 Dharmavarapu Subramanyam
 Dharmendra
 Dhanush
 Dheerendra Gopal
 Dhruva Sarja
 Diganta Hazarika
 Diganth
 Dinesh
 Dingri Nagaraj
 Dino Morea
 Dileep
 Diljit Dosanjh
 Dilip Kumar
 Dilip Prabhavalkar
 Dinesh Lal Yadav
 Divyang Thakkar
 Divyendu Sharma
 Doddanna
 Dulquer Salmaan
 Duniya Vijay
 Dwarakish

E 

 Emraan Hashmi
 Erick Avari

F 

 Fahadh Faasil
 Faisal Khan
 Fardeen Khan
 Farhan Akhtar
 Farooq Sheikh
 Faruk Kabir
 Fawad Khan
 Feroz Khan
 Fish Venkat

G 

 G. K. Govinda Rao
 G. V. Iyer
 Gajendra Chauhan
 Ganesh
 Ganesh Venkatraman
 Gangadhar
 Gaurav Chanana
 Gautham Karthik
 Gautham Vasudev Menon
 Gavie Chahal
 Gemini Ganesan
 Gippy Grewal
 Gireesh Sahedev
 Giri Babu
 Girish Karnad
 Girish Kumar Taurani
 Gufi Paintal
 Gurmeet Choudhary
 Gopal Datt
 Goundamani
 Govinda
 Gubbi Veeranna
 Gulshan Devaiah
 Gulshan Grover
 Gummadi
 Gurdas Maan
 Guru Dutt
 Gurukiran
 Guruprasad
 Gopichand Lagadapati

H 

 Hamsavardhan
 Harbhajan Mann
 Hardy Sandhu
 Harikrishna Nandamuri
 Harish Kumar
 Harish Raj
 Harsh Mayar
 Harshvardhan Kapoor
 Harshvardhan Rane
 Harisree Ashokan
 Harman Baweja
 Himansh Kohli
 Hiran Chatterjee
 Hiten Paintal
 Hiten Tejwani
 Hrithik Roshan
 Himesh Reshammiya
 Honnappa Bhagavathar
 Honnavalli Krishna
 Hunsur Krishnamurthy

I 

 I. S. Johar
 Iftekar
 Imaad Shah
 Imran Abbas Naqvi
 Imran Hasnee
 Imran Khan
 Inder Kumar
 Indrajith Sukumaran
 Indrans
 Inderpal Singh
 Innocent Vincent
 Irrfan Khan
 Inaamulhaq
 Ishaan Khattar
 Ivan Rodriguez

J 

 J. P. Chandrababu
 J. V. Somayajulu
 Jaaved Jaffrey
 Jackie Shroff
 Jackky Bhagnani
 Jagadish
 Jagapati Babu
 Jagathy Sreekumar
 Jagdeep
 Jagdish Raj
 Jaggesh
 Jai
 Jaideep Ahlawat
 Jaishankar
 Jai Akash
 Jai Jagadish
 Jameel Khan
 Jaspal Bhatti
 Jatin Bora
 Javed Sheikh
 Jaya Prakash Reddy
 Jayadev Mohan
 Jayam Ravi
 Jayan
 Jayant
 Jayaram
 Jayram Karthik
 Jayasurya
 Jeet
 Jeetendra
 Jeeva
 Jeevan
 Jhanak Shukla
 Jiiva
 Jim Sarbh
 Jimmy Shergill
 Jisshu Sengupta
 Jitendra Kumar
 Jithan Ramesh
 Joe Simon
 John Abraham
 Johnny Lever
 Johnny Walker
 Joseph Vijay
 Joy Mukherjee
 Jugal Hansraj

K 

 K. Bhagyaraj
 K. L. Saigal
 K. N. Singh
 K. S. Ashwath
 Kabir Bedi
 Kader Khan
 Kaikala Satyanarayana
 Kalabhavan Mani
 Kalyan Kumar
 Kalyan Ram
 Kamaal Rashid Khan
 Kamal Haasan
 Kapil Bora
 Kapil Sharma
 Karan
 Karan Johar
 Karan Kapoor
 Karan Kundra
 Karan Nath
 Karan Singh Grover
 Karan Wahi
 Karibasavaiah
 Karthi
 Karthik
 Kartik Aaryan
 Kartikeya Gummakonda
 Karunas
 Kashinath
 Kashinath Ghanekar
 Kay Kay Menon
 Kayoze Irani
 Keerthiraj
 Kemparaj Urs
 Keshto Mukherjee
 Khayyum Basha
 Khesari Lal Yadav
 Kiku Sharda
 Kiran Kumar
 Kishan Shrikanth
 Kishore
 Kishore Kumar
 Komal Kumar
 Kona Venkat
 Kota Srinivasa Rao
 Krishna (Kannada actor)
 Krishna (Telugu actor)
 Krishnam Raju
 Krishnudu
 Krushna Abhishek
 Kanha Mishra
 Kulbhushan Kharbanda
 Kumar Bangarappa
 Kumar Gaurav
 Kumar Govind
 Kumud Mishra
 Kunaal Roy Kapur
 Kunal Singh
 Kunal Kapoor (born 1959)
 Kunal Kapoor (born 1977)
 Kunal Khemu
 Kunchacko Boban
 Kunigal Nagabhushan
 Kuthiravattam Pappu

L 

 Lavrenti Lopes
 Lawrence Raghavendra
 Laxmikant Berde
 Lekh Tandon
 Lohithaswa
 Lokesh
 Loknath
 Lucky Ali
 Luv Sinha

M 

 Manav Kaul
 M. B. Shetty
 M. G. Ramachandran
 M. G. Soman
 M. K. Raina
 M. K. Thyagaraja Bhagavathar
 M. N. Nambiar
 M. P. Shankar
 M. S. Narayana
 M. V. Vasudeva Rao
 Mac Mohan
 Madan Puri
 Madhu
 Mahendra Sandhu
 Mahesh Babu
 Mahesh Manjrekar
 Mahesh Kothare
 Makrand Deshpande
 Malaysia Vasudevan
 Mammootty
 Mamik Singh
 Mandeep Roy
 Manish Chaudhary
 Mani Damodara Chakyar
 Mani Madhava Chakyar
 Manikuttan
 Manish Raisinghani
 Manivannan
 Manjot Singh
 Manna Dey
 Manish Paul
 Manoj Bajpai
 Manoj Joshi
 Manoj K. Jayan
 Manoj Kumar
 Manoj Manchu
 Manoj Tiger
 Manoj Tiwari
 Master Hirannaiah
 Master Manjunath
 Master Vinayak
 Mehar Mittal
 Mehmood
 Meiyang Chang
 Michael Madhu
 Milind Soman
 Mimoh Chakraborty
 Mithun Chakraborty
 Mithun Tejaswi
 Mohan Agashe
 Mohan Babu
 Mohanlal
 Mohan Joshi
 Mohan Rao
 Mohan Shankar
 Mohit Madaan
 Mohit Marwah
 Mohit Raina
 Mohnish Behl
 Motilal
 Mukesh
 Mukesh Khanna
 Mukesh Tiwari
 Mukkamala
 Mukri
 Mukhyamantri Chandru
 Mukul Dev
 Murali Krishna
 Murali Mohan
 Murali Siddalingaiah
 Mysore Lokesh

N 

 Navin Prabhakar
 N. S. Krishnan
 Naga Chaitanya
 Naga Kiran
 Nagarjuna Akkineni
 Nagesh
 Nagendra Babu
 Nagendra Prasad
 Nageswara Rao Akkineni
 Nagayya V.
 Nagineedu
 Namit Das
 Namit Shah
 Nana Patekar
 Nani
 Narain
 Narasimharaju
 Narasimharaju
 Narendra Prasad
 Naresh
 Naseeruddin Shah
 Nassar
 Navdeep
 Nawazuddin Siddiqui
 Neeraj Kabi
 Nedumudi Venu
 Negro Johnny
 Neil Bhatt
 Neil Nitin Mukesh
 Nikhil Gowda
 Nikhil Siddharth
 Nikitin Dheer
 Nilu Phule
 Ninad Kamat
 Nipon Goswami
 Nithin
 Nivin Pauly
 N. T. Rama Rao
 N. T. Rama Rao Jr.
 Nandish Sandhu
 Nazir Hussain
 Naveen Kasturia
 Naveen Polishetty

O 

 Omkar Kapoor
 Oduvil Unnikrishnan
 Om Prakash
 Om Puri
 Om Shivpuri
 Omi Vaidya

P 

 Pankaj Dheer
 Pankaj Kapoor
 Pankaj Tripathi
 Parambrata Chatterjee
 Paresh Rawal
 Parikshit Sahni
 Parmeet Sethi
 Parvin Dabas
 Parzan Dastur
 Pasupathy
 Pawan Kalyan
 Pinchoo Kapoor
 Piyush Mishra
 Prabal Panjabi
 Prabhas
 Prabhu Deva
 Prabhu
 Pradeep Kumar
 Pradeep Pandey
 Pradeep Rawat
 Prajwal Devaraj
 Prakash Raj
 Pran
 Pranav Mohanlal
 Prasadbabu
 Prasanna
 Prasenjit Chatterjee
 Prashant Damle
 Prashanta Nanda
 Prashanth Thyagarajan
 Prateik Babbar
 Prathap
 Prem
 Prem Chopra
 Prem Kumar
 Prem Nath
 Prem Nazir
 Prithviraj Ballireddy
 Prithviraj Kapoor
 Prithviraj Sukumaran
 Pu La Deshpande
 Pulkit Samrat
 Puneet Issar
 Puneet Rajkumar
 Puri Jagannadh
 Pawan Singh

R 

 R. Madhavan
 R. Nagendra Rao
 R. Nageshwara Rao
 Raaj Kumar
 Raghav Juyal
 Raghavendra Rajkumar
 Raghu Babu
 Raghu Mukherjee
 Raghubir Yadav
 Raghuvaran
 Rahman
 Rahul Roy
 Rahul Bose
 Rahul Dev
 Raja Shankar
 Raj Babbar
 Raj Kapoor
 Rajanala
 Rajanand
 Rajesh Sharma, born 1971
 Rajesh Sharma, born 1973
 Rajkummar Rao
 Rajat Barmecha
 Rajendra Gupta
 Rajendra Kumar
 Rajendra Nath
 Rajesh (Kala Thapaswi)
 Rajesh Khanna
 Rajesh Khattar
 Rajesh Krishnan
 Rajit Kapoor
 Rajinikanth
 Ram Kapoor
 Rajeev Verma
 Rajiv Kanakala
 Rajiv Kapoor
 Rajkumar
 Rajneesh Duggal
 Rajpal Yadav
 Raju Srivastav
 Rakesh Bedi
 Rakesh Roshan
 Ramakrishna
 Ramki
 Ram Charan Teja
 Ramesh Aravind
 Ramesh Babu
 Ramesh Bhat
 Ramesh Deo
 Ramesh Khanna
 Ram Kumar
 Ram Pothineni
 Ranbir Kapoor
 Randeep Hooda
 Randhir Kapoor
 Ranjeet
 Ranveer Singh
 Ranvir Shorey
 Ravi Babu
 Ravi Kishan
 Ravi Prakash
 Ravi Sarma
 Ravi Shankar
 Ravi Teja
 Ravichandran
 Ravichandran Veeraswamy
 Raza Murad
 Richard Rishi
 Rishi Kapoor
 Riteish Deshmukh
 Riyaz Khan
 Rockline Venkatesh
 Rohit Roy
 Ronit Roy
 Roshan Seth

S 

 S. Narayan
 S Sathyendra
 S. J. Suryah
 S. P. Balasubrahmanyam
 S. P. B. Charan
 S. Shankar
 S. V. Ranga Rao
 Saandip
 Sachin Pilgaonkar
 Sachin Khedekar
 Sadhu Kokila
 Saeed Jaffrey
 Sahil Khan
 Sahil Shroff
 Sahil Vaid
 Sai Kumar
 Sai Kumar
 Saif Ali Khan
 Sai Dharam Tej
 Sajid Khan
 Sajjad Delafrooz
 Saleem Kumar
 Salim Khan
 Salman Khan
 Sameer Dattani
 Samir Kochhar
 Samir Soni
 Sampath
 Sampath Raj
 Sandeep Kulkarni
 Sanjay Dutt
 Sanjay Kapoor
 Sanjay Khan
 Sanjay Mishra
 Sanjay Suri
 Sanjeev Bhaskar
 Sanjeev Kumar
 Sanjeev Tyagi
 Sankaradi
 Sanketh Kashi
 Santhanam
 Sapru
 Saqib Saleem
 Sarath Babu
 Sarath Kumar
 Sarfaraz Khan
 Sarigama Viji
 Sathyaraj
 Sathyan Nadar
 Sathyan Sivakumar
 Satish Shah
 Sathish Ninasam
 Satyajeet Puri
 Sathyajith
 Saurabh Shukla
 Sayaji Shinde
 Sayak Chakraborty
 Senthil
 Shaad Randhawa
 Shaam
 Shaan
 Shahid Kapoor
 Shah Rukh Khan
 Shammi Kapoor
 Shani Mahadevappa
 Shankar
 Shankar Nag
 Shanthanu Bhagyaraj
 Sharad Kelkar
 Sharad Talwalkar
 Sharman Joshi
 Sharat Saxena
 Sharath Babu
 Sharath Kumar
 Sharath Lohitashwa
 Sharman Joshi
 Shashank shende
 Shashi Kapoor
 Shashikumar
 Shatrughan Sinha
 Shehzad Khan
 Shekhar Suman
 Shiny Ahuja
 Shirish Kunder
 Shivkumar Subramaniam
 Shivam Patil
 Shivarajkumar
 Shobraj
 Shreela Ghosh
 Shreyas Talpade
 Shriram Lagoo
 Sibiraj
 Siddhant Chaturvedi
 Sidhant Gupta
 Sidharth Malhotra
 Sidharth Shukla
 Siddhanta Mahapatra
 Siddharth Koirala
 Siddharth Narayan
 Siddharth Nigam
 Sikandar Kher
 Silambarasan Rajendar
 Sihi Kahi Chandru
 Sikandar Kher
 Siva Reddy
 Sivaji Ganesan
 Sivakarthikeyan
 Sivakumar
 Sobhan Babu
 Sohail Khan
 Soham Chakraborty
 Sohrab Modi
 Sonu Nigam
 Sonu Sood
 Sooraj Pancholi
 Sreenivasan
 Sri Murali
 Sridhar
 Srihari
 Srikanth Krishnamachari
 Srikanth Meka
 Sriman
 Srinagar Kitty
 Srinath
 Srinivasa Murthy
 Srinivasa Reddy
 Sriram Panda
 Srujan Lokesh
 Subbaraju
 Subbaraya Sharma
 Subrat Dutta
 Suchindra Bali
 Sudeepa
 Sudheer
 Subodh Bhave
 Sudheer Babu
 Sudhir Dalvi
 Sujan Mukhopadhyay
 Sukumaran
 Suman Setty
 Suman Talwar
 Sumanth
 Sumeet Raghavan
 Sundar Krishna Urs
 Sundar Raj
 Sundeep Kishan
 Suneil Anand
 Sunil
 Sunil Dutt
 Sunil Grover
 Sunil Raoh
 Sunil Shetty
 Sunil Varma
 Sunny Deol
 Sunny Gill
 Sunny Singh
 Suresh
 Suresh Gopi
 Suresh Heblikar
 Suresh Joachim
 Suresh Menon
 Suresh Oberoi
 Surya Sivakumar
 Suryakant Mandhare
 Sushant Singh Rajput
 Sushanth
 Suthivelu
 Sutti Veerabhadra Rao
 Swwapnil Joshi

T 

 Tabla Nani
 Taher Shabbir
 Tahir Raj Bhasin
 Tanay Chheda
 Tanikella Bharani
 Tapas Paul
 Taraka Ratna
 Tarun Arora
 Tarun Chandra
 Tarun Kumar
 Tathagata Mukherjee
 Thagubothu Ramesh
 Thikkurissy Sukumaran Nair
 Thilakan
 Tharani
 Thalaivasal Vijay
 Tiger Shroff
 Tinnu Anand
 Tiku Talsania
 Tigmanshu Dhulia
 Tom Alter
 Tottempudi Gopichand
 Tusshar Kapoor
 Tushar Pandey

U 

 Uday Chopra
 Uday Kiran
 Udaykumar
 Unni Mukundan
 Upen Patel
 Upendra
 Upendra Limaye
 Utpal Dutt
 Uttam Kumar
 Uttam Mohanty

V 

 Vadivelu
 Vajramuni
 Varun Dhawan
 Varun Tej
 Varun Sandesh
 Varun Sharma
 Veeru Devgan
 Venkatesh
 Vennela Kishore
 Venu Madhav
 Vicky Kaushal
 Vidharth
 Vidyut Jammwal
 Vijay Arora
 Vijay Chandrasekhar
 Vijay Deverakonda
 Vijay Duniya
 Vijay Raaz
 Vijay Raghavendra
 Vijay Sethupathi
 Vijayakanth
 Vijayakumar
 Vijayaraghavan
 Vijay Antony
 Vijay Kashi
 Vijay Varma
 Vikas Kalantri
 Vikas Sethi
 Vikram Gokhale
 Vikram Kennedy
 Vikram Prabhu
 Vikram Singh Chauhan
 Vikrant Massey
 Vikranth
 Vimal
 Vinay Apte
 Vinay Pathak
 Vinay Rai
 Vinayak Joshi
 Vindu Dara Singh
 Vineeth
 Vineet Kumar
 Vineeth Sreenivasan
 Vinod Khanna
 Vinod Mehra
 Vipin Sharma
 Vir Das
 Vishal Jethwa
 Vishal Krishna
 Vishal Karwal
 Vishnu Manchu
 Vishnu Vishal
 Vishnuvardhan
 Vivaan Shah
 Vivek
 Vivek Oberoi
 Vivek Mushran
 Vrajesh Hirjee
 VTV Ganesh

Y 

 Yash
 Yash Dasgupta
 Yash Pandit
 Yashpal Sharma
 Yash Tandon
 Yash Tonk
 Yatin Karyekar
 Yogesh
 Yugendran
 Yugi Sethu

Z 

 Zayed Khan
 Mohammed Zeeshan Ayub Khan
 Zeishan Quadri
 Zubeen Garg
 Zulfi Syed

See also
 List of Bhojpuri actors
 List of Bhojpuri actresses
 List of Hindi film actors
 List of Hindi film actresses
 List of Indian film actresses
 List of Indian television actors
 List of Tamil film actors
 List of Tamil film actresses
 Lists of actors

References

 
Film
Lists of male actors